Libyan language may refer to:
the Eastern Berber languages
Libyan Arabic
the Numidian language, also called Libyan or Old Libyan, a largely undeciphered language using the Libyco-Berber script

See also
Languages of Libya